Jennifer Claire McElwain is an Irish palaeobotanist. She is a full professor in the Trinity College Dublin's (TCD) School of Natural Sciences and hold the 1711 Chair of Botany. She is also the Director of Trinity College Botanic Garden. McElwain held the position of Assistant Curator of Paleobotany at the Field Museum of Natural History in Chicago between 2000 and 2003 and later Associate Curator of Paleobotany from 2003 until 2006.

Early life and education
McElwain was born into an academic family; her father was a chemical engineer and her mother was a gardener. When speaking of her childhood, she said: "I knew the Latin names of all the plants at the age of three. It was seeded early." McElwain completed her Bachelor of Arts degree in Botany from Trinity College Dublin (TCD) in 1993 and her PhD in Paleobotany in 1997 from the Royal Holloway, University of London. During her first year at TCD, she was influenced to pursue a career as a palaeobotanist after enrolling in a course focusing on quaternary palynology and geomorphology of the Irish landscape. Following this, she was a Natural Environment Research Council Post Doctoral student and a Leverhulme Postdoctoral Fellow between 1998 and 2000 at the University of Sheffield. As a postgraduate student at Sheffield University, McElwain studied the impact carbon dioxide had on global warming by examining plant fossils collected in Greenland during the 1920s. In order to gather the fossils, she led a team of scientists in Greenland for one month to collect over 1,000 fossils.

Career
While engaging in post-doctoral work at the University of Sheffield, McElwain also held the position of Assistant Curator of Paleobotany at the Field Museum of Natural History in Chicago between 2000 and 2003 and later Associate Curator of Paleobotany from 2003 until 2006. In these roles, she studied fossil leaves of plants that grew before, during and after the die-off of Triassic plants and animals. Through these fossils, McElwain found evidence of a rapid surge of seven times the normal amount of CO (-2) in the atmosphere. In 2004, she counted stomata to know where mountains and plateaus were located in the past, presenting barriers to atmospheric circulation. Two years later, McElwain accepted a faculty position at the University College Dublin and received the Award for Excellence in EU research by the President of Ireland in 2012.

As a Professor of Botany at TCD, McElwain edited the book  14 Expeditions which she said "showcases the breadth and importance of botany as a modern science addressing global research challenges." She also continued her research into  CO (-2) in the atmosphere and led a study in 2019 which found that holly and ivy are more climate change-ready in the face of warming temperatures than birch and oak. During the COVID-19 pandemic, McElwain came up with the idea to film five-minute videos to showcase Ireland's native plants and wild places.

In 2017 she was admitted as a member of the Royal Irish Academy.

Selected publications
The Evolution of Plants (2002)
The Evolution of Plants (2nd edition) (2013)

References

External links

Living people
Irish women scientists
Date of birth missing (living people)
Women botanists
Paleobotanists
Academics of Trinity College Dublin
Alumni of Royal Holloway, University of London
Members of the Royal Irish Academy
Year of birth missing (living people)